Psycho-Narco is the seventh studio album by Scottish rock band The Almighty.

Track listing 
All songs written by Ricky Warwick except as indicated
"Galvanise" – 3:31
"427 Freak Horsepower" – 3:52
"Ruse" – 4:30
"Soul on a Roll" (Parsons) – 3:11
"Begging" (Warwick/James) – 2:59
"Hate the World" (Parsons)- 3:00
"Waiting for Earthquakes" – 4:58
"If I Knew What I Wanted" – 2:43
"7x" – 3:27
"Big Idea Idiot" (Parsons) – 1:56
"Mondo Balordo" – 3:40
"Blowout Kit (For the Underdog)" (Parsons) – 2:31
"Witness Relocation Programme" – 3:01
"Million Times Nothing" – 2:21

Personnel 
The Almighty
Ricky Warwick – vocals, guitars
Nick Parsons – guitars
Stump Munroe – drums, percussion, vocals
Gav Gray – bass

Additional musicians
Dan Turner – additional vocals
Andy Cairns – additional vocals
Joe Elliott – additional vocals

Production
Produced and engineered by Daniel Rey
Recorded at Parkgate Studios, Sussex
Mixed by Daniel Rey at Greene Street Studios, New York City
Mastered by Howie Weinberg at Masterdisk, New York City

References 

2001 albums
The Almighty (band) albums
Sanctuary Records albums
Albums produced by Daniel Rey